The Town of Keenesburg is a Statutory Town in Weld County, Colorado, United States.  The population was 1127 at the 2010 United States Census.

Contents
Keenesburg was named for Les Keene, an early settler.

Geography
Keenesburg is located at  (40.108821, -104.520228).

Government
As of January 2023, the  mayor of Keenesburg is Aron Lam.

Demographics

As of the census of 2000, there were 855 people, 300 households, and 234 families residing in the town. The racial makeup of the town was 92.05% White, 0.23% African American, 0.47% Native American, 0.35% Asian, 4.56% from other races, and 2.34% from two or more races. Hispanic or Latino of any race were 7.84% of the population.

There were 300 households, out of which 41.0% had children under the age of 18 living with them, 63.3% were married couples living together, 11.3% had a female householder with no husband present, and 21.7% were non-families. 16.3% of all households were made up of individuals, and 7.7% had someone living alone who was 65 years of age or older.  The average household size was 2.83 and the average family size was 3.16.

In the town, the population was spread out, with 31.1% under the age of 18, 6.5% from 18 to 24, 31.2% from 25 to 44, 19.4% from 45 to 64, and 11.7% who were 65 years of age or older.  The median age was 32 years. For every 100 females, there were 96.1 males.  For every 100 females age 18 and over, there were 91.2 males.

The median income for a household in the town was $41,417, and the median income for a family was $43,864. Males had a median income of $30,682 versus $27,188 for females. The per capita income for the town was $17,022.  About 5.0% of families and 9.4% of the population were below the poverty line, including 16.9% of those under age 18 and 16.7% of those age 65 or over.

See also

Outline of Colorado
Index of Colorado-related articles
State of Colorado
Colorado cities and towns
Colorado municipalities
Colorado counties
Weld County, Colorado
Colorado metropolitan areas
Front Range Urban Corridor
North Central Colorado Urban Area
Denver-Aurora-Boulder, CO Combined Statistical Area
Greeley, CO Metropolitan Statistical Area

References

External links
Town of Keenesburg website
CDOT map of the Town of Keenesburg

Towns in Weld County, Colorado
Towns in Colorado